Kateryna Mikhailivna Zubkova (born July 14, 1988 in Kharkiv) is a Ukrainian swimmer.

Career
She has won national titles for Ukraine eight times, and is a former European breaststroke champion. She has competed at numerous international meets, including the 2004 Summer Olympics, the 2004 and 2006 European Short Course Swimming Championships, and the 2007 World Aquatics Championships.

During the 2007 World Aquatics Championships in Melbourne, she briefly made national headlines after the event's broadcaster filmed a violent altercation between her and Mikhail Zubkov, her father and coach. As a result of the incident, FINA withdrew Mikhail's coaching accreditation, and Victoria Police obtained an intervention order barring him from going within 200 metres of his daughter, although the order was later struck out in the Melbourne Magistrates' Court.

She later joined the Indiana University swim team to continue her training and education.

References

External links
 
 

1988 births
Ukrainian female backstroke swimmers
Living people
Swimmers at the 2004 Summer Olympics
Swimmers at the 2008 Summer Olympics
Olympic swimmers of Ukraine
Medalists at the FINA World Swimming Championships (25 m)
National University of Kharkiv alumni
Universiade medalists in swimming
Universiade silver medalists for Ukraine
Medalists at the 2007 Summer Universiade
Sportspeople from Kharkiv